Valery Karshakevich (born 15 February 1988) is a Belarusian professional football player who plays in Kazakhstan for Spartak Semey.

Club career
On 29 January 2020 he joined Kazakhstan Premier League club FC Taraz.

Honours
Torpedo-BelAZ Zhodino
Belarusian Cup winner: 2015–16

References

External links

1988 births
Living people
People from Marjina Horka
Sportspeople from Minsk Region
Belarusian footballers
Association football defenders
FC Molodechno players
FC Shakhtyor Soligorsk players
FC Naftan Novopolotsk players
FC Torpedo-BelAZ Zhodino players
FC Dynamo Brest players
FC Belshina Bobruisk players
FC Granit Mikashevichi players
FC Slutsk players
FC Gomel players
FC Smolevichi players
FC Dnyapro Mogilev players
FC Mordovia Saransk players
FC Taraz players
FC Kyzylzhar players
FC Spartak Semey players
Belarusian Premier League players
Kazakhstan Premier League players
Belarusian expatriate footballers
Expatriate footballers in Russia
Expatriate footballers in Kazakhstan